Sandra W. Freedman (born September 21, 1943, in Newark, New Jersey) is a former politician in Tampa, Florida. She was the first female mayor of Tampa, Florida and after completing a term for Bob Martinez was elected to two terms.

Freedman graduated with a degree in government from the University of Miami. She married Michael J. Freedman, an attorney, and the couple has three children. She was also the chairman of the Board of the National Civic League from 2008 to 2011.

She served on the City Council from 1974 and then as Council Chair from 1983 through July 16, 1986.  She completed the remaining term of Bob Martinez who resigned to successfully campaign for Governor of Florida. After completing the remainder of Martinez's term, Freedman was twice elected Mayor of Tampa.

External links
City of Tampa biography page
Tampa Mayor Sandy Freedman Oral History Project at the University of South Florida

1943 births
Living people
Politicians from Newark, New Jersey
University of Miami alumni
Florida city council members
Women city councillors in Florida
Mayors of Tampa, Florida
Women mayors of places in Florida
21st-century American women